Lafayette County is a county in the western portion of Missouri, part of the Kansas City metropolitan area. As of the 2010 census, the population was 33,381. Its county seat is Lexington. The county was organized November 16, 1820 from Cooper County and originally named Lillard County for James Lillard of Tennessee, who served in the first state constitutional convention and first state legislature. It was renamed Lafayette County on February 16, 1825, in honor of Revolutionary War hero the Marquis de La Fayette, who was then visiting the United States.

History
Lafayette County was settled primarily from migrants from the Upper Southern states of Kentucky, Tennessee and Virginia. They brought enslaved people and slaveholding traditions and started cultivating crops similar to those in Middle Tennessee and Kentucky: hemp and tobacco.

Peter Youree (1843-1914) was born here to merchant P. E. Youree and the former M. M. Zimmerman. As a young man, he enlisted in the Confederate forces from here, and gained the rank of captain during the American Civil War. Afterward, he settled in Shreveport, Louisiana, where he married, became a successful merchant and banker, and served on the Caddo Parish Police Jury.

As a result of the migration from the South, this part of Missouri, and neighboring counties, became known as Little Dixie. In 1860 enslaved people made up 25 percent or more of the county's population, and the county was strongly pro-Confederate during the American Civil War.

But immigrants from Germany, as well as German Americans from St. Louis, began arriving shortly before the war, with many more to come afterwards. Many of the Germans were sympathetic to the Union and opposed slavery. They eventually made up a large part of the populations of Concordia, Emma, Wellington, Napoleon, Higginsville, Mayview, and Lexington.

After the war, there were racial tensions as whites worked to dominate the freedmen. Following Reconstruction, whites lynched two blacks in the decades around the turn of the century.

Sunday May 4th 1919, Lafayette County Sheriff Joseph C. Talbott was killed while transporting car thieves to jail.  Also killed were Deputy Sheriff John McDonald and Deputy Constable James Stapleton.  On May 29th 1919, Lafayette County held a special election to replace Sheriff Talbott.  Sheriff Talbott's wife, Minnie Mae Talbott, won the special election becoming the first woman elected to the office of Sheriff in the United States.  Minnie Mae Talbott was sworn into office on June 8th 1919.  Minnie Mae Talbott was elected by an all-male electorate.  Women would not gain the right to vote until August 1920, with ratification of the 19th Amendment to the U.S. Constitution.

21st century

In November 2013, Leland Ray Kolkmeyer pleaded guilty, in federal court, of a fraud scheme in which he embezzled more than $1.5 million from Wellington-Napoleon Fire Protection District and Special Road District while serving as their treasurer.

Geography

Adjacent counties
Ray County (northwest)
Carroll County (northeast)
Saline County (east)
Johnson County (south)
Jackson County (west)
Pettis County (southeast)

Major highways
 Interstate 70
 U.S. Route 24
 U.S. Route 40
 U.S. Route 65
 Route 13
 Route 23
 Route 131
 Route 224

National protected area
Big Muddy National Fish and Wildlife Refuge (part)

Demographics

As of the census of 2000, there were 32,960 people, 12,569 households, and 9,099 families residing in the county.  The population density was 52 people per square mile (20/km2).  There were 13,707 housing units at an average density of 22 per square mile (8/km2).  The racial makeup of the county was 95.52% White, 2.27% Black or African American, 0.29% Native American, 0.25% Asian, 0.03% Pacific Islander, 0.51% from other races, and 1.12% from two or more races. Approximately 1.17% of the population were Hispanic or Latino of any race. 37.3% were of German, 17.5% American, 9.9% English and 9.7% Irish ancestry.

There were 12,569 households, out of which 33.90% had children under the age of 18 living with them, 59.30% were married couples living together, 9.40% had a female householder with no husband present, and 27.60% were non-families. 24.00% of all households were made up of individuals, and 11.20% had someone living alone who was 65 years of age or older.  The average household size was 2.55 and the average family size was 3.01.

In the county, the population was spread out, with 26.20% under the age of 18, 7.60% from 18 to 24, 27.50% from 25 to 44, 23.30% from 45 to 64, and 15.40% who were 65 years of age or older.  The median age was 38 years. For every 100 females there were 95.90 males.  For every 100 females age 18 and over, there were 92.00 males.

The median income for a household in the county was $38,235, and the median income for a family was $45,717. Males had a median income of $31,972 versus $22,684 for females. The per capita income for the county was $18,493.  About 6.90% of families and 8.80% of the population were below the poverty line, including 10.90% of those under age 18 and 9.10% of those ages 65 or over.

2020 Census

Education

Public schools
Concordia R-II School District – Concordia
Concordia Elementary School (PK-06)
Concordia High School (07-12)
Lafayette County C-1 School District – Higginsville
Grandview Elementary School (PK-05)
Lafayette County Middle School (06-08)
Lafayette County High School (09-12)
Lexington R-V School District – Lexington
Leslie Bell Elementary School (PK-04)
Lexington Middle School (05-08)
Lexington High School (09-12)
Odessa R-VII School District – Odessa
McQuerry Elementary School (K-02)
Odessa Upper Elementary School (03-05)
Odessa Middle School (06-08)
Odessa High School (09-12)
Santa Fe R-X School District – Alma
Santa Fe Elementary School (K-06)
Santa Fe High School (07-12)
Wellington-Napoleon R-IX School District  – Wellington
Wellington-Napoleon Elementary School (PK-06)
Wellington-Napoleon High School (07-12)

Private schools
Trinity Lutheran School – Alma (K-09) – Lutheran
Holy Cross Lutheran School – Emma (PK-08) – Lutheran
Immanuel Lutheran School  – Higginsville (K-09) – Lutheran
Victory Christian Fellowship School  – Waverly (K-12) – Nondenominational Christian
St. Paul Lutheran High School – Concordia (09-12) – Lutheran
St. Paul's Lutheran School – Concordia (K-8) – Lutheran

Public Libraries
Robertson Memorial Library  
Trails Regional Library

Politics

Local
The Republican Party mostly controls politics at the local level in Lafayette County. Republicans hold a little more than half of the elected positions in the county.

State

Lafayette County is divided into two legislative districts in the Missouri House of Representatives, both of which are held by Republicans.

District 33 — Donna Pfautsch (R-Harrisonville).  Consists of the community of Oak Grove.

District 53 – Glen Kolkmeyer (R-Odessa). Consists of almost all of the county.

All of Lafayette County is a part of Missouri's 21st District in the Missouri Senate and is currently represented by Denny Hoskins (R-Warrensburg).

Federal

All of Lafayette County is included in Missouri's 5th Congressional District, which is currently represented by Emanuel Cleaver (D-Kansas City) in the U.S. House of Representatives.

Communities

Cities and towns

Alma
Aullville
Bates City
Blackburn (part)
Concordia
Corder
Dover
Emma (part)
Higginsville
Lake Lafayette
Lexington (county seat)
Mayview
Napoleon
Oak Grove (part)
Odessa
Waverly
Wellington

Unincorporated communities

 Chapel Hill
 Ernestville
 Greenton
 Hodge
 Myrick
 Page City
 Tabeau
 Waterloo

See also
 List of counties in Missouri
National Register of Historic Places listings in Lafayette County, Missouri

References

External links
Lafayette County Website
 Digitized 1930 Plat Book of Lafayette County  from University of Missouri Division of Special Collections, Archives, and Rare Books

 
Little Dixie (Missouri)
Missouri counties on the Missouri River
1820 establishments in Missouri Territory
Populated places established in 1820